Sergey Shiroky (born 24 March 1966) is a retired Belarusian professional footballer and Belarus international.

Honours
Dinamo Minsk
Belarusian Premier League champion: 1994–95, 1995

External links
 
 Profile at teams.by

1966 births
Living people
Soviet footballers
Belarusian footballers
FC Dinamo Minsk players
FC Dinamo-93 Minsk players
FC Torpedo Minsk players
FC Belshina Bobruisk players
FC Shakhtyor Soligorsk players
Belarus international footballers
Belarusian expatriate footballers
Expatriate footballers in Georgia (country)
Association football midfielders
People from Babruysk
Sportspeople from Mogilev Region